Cross Point may refer to:
Cross Point (Lowell, Massachusetts), an office tower in Lowell, Massachusetts
Pointe-à-la-Croix, Quebec
Cross Point, a subdivision in Owings, Maryland
Cross Point Road in Edgecomb, Maine
Cross Point (album) by the group Casiopea

See also
Crosspoint, a 1977 Canadian television show
Crosspointe, Virginia
Point Cross, Nova Scotia
Cross-point screw
Crossbar switch, also called a cross-point switch